Queen of Fashion or The Competition Bursts (German: Königin der Mode or Die Konkurrenz platzt) is a 1929 German silent comedy film directed by Max Obal and Rudolf Walther-Fein and starring Harry Liedtke, María Corda, and Ernö Verebes.

The film's sets were designed by Botho Hoefer and Hans Minzloff.

Cast
 Harry Liedtke as Bernd Jensen  
 María Corda as Marion Gutman  
 Ernö Verebes as Leo Sanders  
 Peggy Norman as Erika Bendix  
 Hermann Picha as Paul Lyon  
 Karl Elzer as Graf Aranyi  
 Hugo Fischer-Köppe as Max Bendix 
 Ibolya Szekely

References

Bibliography
 Hans-Michael Bock and Tim Bergfelder. The Concise Cinegraph: An Encyclopedia of German Cinema. Berghahn Books, 2009.

External links

1929 films
1929 comedy films
German comedy films
Films of the Weimar Republic
German silent feature films
Films directed by Max Obal
Films directed by Rudolf Walther-Fein
Films about fashion
German black-and-white films
Silent comedy films
1920s German films
1920s German-language films